Bernard of Luxemburg (died 1535) was a Dominican theologian, controversialist, and Inquisitor of the Archdioceses of Cologne, Mainz, and Trier.

Biography
Born at Strassen near Cologne; died at Cologne, 5 October 1535. He studied at the latter place where he entered the Order of Preachers, received the baccalaureate at Leuven, 1499, and was appointed Master of Students at Cologne, 1506. In 1507, he became Regent of Studies at Leuven; fellow of the college of Doctors at Cologne, in 1516; and served twice as Prior of Cologne.

As the author of the Catalogus haereticorum, he has been described as somewhat lacking in critical judgment; but he was otherwise a safe and indefatigable defender of the Faith against the heretics of his time. His important works are: Catalogus haereticorum omnium, etc. (Erfurt, 1522; Cologne, 1523; Paris 1524); Concilium generale malignantium, etc. (1528); De ordinibus militaribus, etc. (Cologne, 1527).

References

Emil van der Vekene: Bernhard von Luxemburg, um 1460–1535.Bibliographie. Wiesbaden: Guido Pressler,1985. .

German Dominicans
16th-century German Catholic theologians
15th-century births
1535 deaths